Richard Goddard may refer to:

Politicians
 Richard Goddard (died 1596), MP for Southampton
 Richard Goddard (died 1666), MP for Winchester
 Richard Goddard (died 1732), MP for Wootton Bassett and Wiltshire

Sports
 Richard Goddard (footballer) (born 1978), former Trinidad and Tobago football goalkeeper
 Richard Goddard (rugby league) (born 1974), English rugby league footballer who played in the 1990s and 2000s 
 Richard Goddard-Crawley (born 1978), British semi-professional association football midfielder
 Dicky Goddard (1879–1949), English rugby union, and rugby league footballer who played in the 1890s and 1900s 
 Spike Goddard (Richard Goddard, born 1992), Australian racing driver

Others
 Dick Goddard (born 1931), American television meteorologist, author, cartoonist, and animal activist
 Rick Goddard, retired U.S. Air Force general and candidate for Congress

See also
 Goddard (disambiguation)